The USS Stark incident occurred during the Iran–Iraq War on 17 May 1987, when an Iraqi jet aircraft fired two Exocet missiles at the American frigate . A total of 37 United States Navy personnel were killed or later died as a result of the attack, and 21 were injured.

Incident

 was part of the Middle East Task Force assigned to patrol off the Saudi Arabian coast near the Iran–Iraq War exclusion boundary. At the time, the United States Central Command identified the attacking aircraft as an Iraqi Dassault Mirage F1 fighter. However, later reporting has asserted that the attacking aircraft was a Dassault Falcon 50 business jet which had been modified with a radar and missile hardpoints to carry two AM-39 Exocet missiles for anti-shipping operations. The F1EQ-5 variant of the Mirage F1 operated by Iraq at the time was only capable of carrying a single Exocet. Iraq had previously used modified Falcon jets in civilian markings to conduct covert photographic reconnaissance in the Persian Gulf to avoid attracting suspicion.

Initially not alarmed, at 22:09 Captain Glenn R. Brindel ordered a radioman to send the message: "Unknown aircraft, this is U.S. Navy warship on your 078 (degrees) for twelve miles. Request you identify yourself." The Iraqi pilot did not respond to the message. The ship's captain ordered a second message sent, to which there was no reply. At 22:10 Brindel was informed the Iraqi aircraft had targeted his ship, locking his Cyrano-IV fire-control radar onto Stark. The pilot then banked left and began to withdraw.

Starks search radar, ESM and CIWS systems failed to detect the incoming missiles. The first Exocet missile struck the port side of the ship near the bridge. Although it failed to detonate, rocket fuel ignited and caused a large fire that quickly spread throughout the ship's post office, storeroom, and the critical combat operations center (where the ship's weapons are controlled).

The second Exocet also struck the port side, 30 seconds later. This missile detonated, leaving a  hole in the frigate's left side. Electronics for Starks Standard Missile defense went out and Brindel could not order his men to return fire. An AWACS plane was still in the area and just after witnessing the attack, radioed a nearby Saudi airbase to send aircraft for an interception, but the ground controllers did not have the authority to order a sortie and the Iraqi jet left unharmed. The USN (United States Navy) rules of engagement applicable at the time allowed Stark to defend herself after sufficiently warning the hostile aircraft. A total of 37 crew were killed in the attack, 29 from the initial explosion and fire, including two lost at sea. Eight later died from their injuries. Twenty-one others survived their wounds.

Brindel ordered the starboard side flooded to keep the hole on the hull's port side above water. This helped prevent the Stark from sinking. Brindel quickly dispatched a distress call after the first missile hit. Waddell and Conyngham arrived to provide damage control and relief to Starks crew. According to the Pentagon, an Iranian helicopter joined a Saudi Arabian vessel to aid in rescue operations.

Aftermath

Stark arrived at Bahrain the following day, 18 May 1987. There she was temporarily repaired by the destroyer tender  before setting a course for Mayport Naval Station, Florida, the ship's home port. A court of inquiry under Rear Admiral Grant Sharp was formed to investigate the incident and later Captain Brindel was recommended for court-martial but was ultimately only reprimanded and relieved of duty. It was found that Stark was  outside the exclusion zone and had not violated neutrality as the Iraqis claimed. Iraq apologized, and Saddam Hussein said that the pilot mistook Stark for an Iranian tanker.

American officials claimed that the Iraqi jet's pilot was not acting under orders from his government and that he was later executed, but an Iraqi Air Force officer later stated that the pilot was not punished and that he was still alive. According to Jean-Louis Bernard, author of "Heroes of Bagdad" T1 (Editions JPO 2017), the pilot, Abdul Rahman, would have received the medal of bravery at the end of a joint Iraqi-American commission of inquiry. His subsequent defection to Iran is not mentioned in this book. Jean-Louis Bernard also confirms the use of a Falcon 50 during this action.

Iranian Prime Minister Mir Hossein Mousavi called it a "divine blessing" and reiterated the standard Iranian view that the Persian Gulf "is not a safe place for the superpowers and it is in their interest not to enter this quicksand". Iraq Foreign Ministry spokesman said Iraq would never intentionally attack any target in the Gulf unless it was Iranian, and laid the blame on Iran.

Washington used the incident to pressure Iran, which it later blamed for the whole situation. President Ronald Reagan said "We've never considered them [Iraq's military] hostile at all", and "the villain in the piece is Iran".

The Joint Chiefs of Staff investigation into the incident recommended that Iraq be held accountable, a finding the government of Iraq eventually complied with. Captain Brindel was relieved of duty and retired as a commander for not defending his ship and tactical action officer Lieutenant Basil E. Moncrief resigned.

Claims
On 21 June 2011, an agreement was reached between the governments of the United States and Iraq regarding claims of United States citizens against the regime of Saddam Hussein. The Iraqi government established a fund of $400 million to compensate prisoners of war and hostages in the Persian Gulf War, and those killed or injured in the 1987 attack on Stark. The United States Department of State was to establish a mechanism to process applications for compensation.

Memorials

On 22 May 1987, a eulogy was given by president Ronald Reagan at Mayport Naval Station, Jacksonville, Florida.

A ceremony is held at Mayport Naval Station on 17 May each year to remember the 37 men who died in the incident. The ceremony in 2012 was the 25th anniversary of the attack.

See also
USS Vincennes incident
USS Panay incident
USS Liberty incident
USS Pueblo incident
Gulf of Tonkin incident
Battle of Đồng Hới

References

Sources

Jeffrey L, Levinson, Randy L. Edwards, "Missile Inbound", Annapolis: Naval Institute Press (1997), .

Further reading
Formal Investigation into the Circumstances Surrounding the Attack of the USS Stark in 1987, and  further endorsememts.
 

Airstrikes
Naval battles of the Iran–Iraq War involving the United States
Naval battles involving Iraq
Conflicts in 1987
Stark
Iraq–United States military relations
Combat incidents
1987 in Iraq
1987 in the United States
International maritime incidents
Stark
Cold War military history of the United States
May 1987 events in Asia